The Punj Lloyd PSA Masters 2011 is the men's edition of the 2012 PSA Masters, which is a PSA World Series event Platinum (Prize money: $165,000). The event took place in New Delhi in India from 12 December to 18 December. James Willstrop won his first PSA Masters trophy, beating Grégory Gaultier in the final.

Prize money and ranking points
For 2011, the prize purse was $165,000. The prize money and points breakdown is as follows:

Seeds

Draw and results

See also
PSA Masters
2011 Men's World Open Squash Championship
PSA World Tour 2011
PSA World Series 2011

References

External links
Punj Lloyd PSA Masters 2011 website
Punj Lloyd PSA Masters 2011 official website
PSA Masters 2011 Squash Site website

Squash tournaments in India
Men's PSA Masters
Men's PSA Masters
International sports competitions hosted by India
December 2011 sports events in India